Roxanne is a 1987 American romantic comedy film directed by Fred Schepisi and starring Steve Martin and Daryl Hannah. It is a modern retelling of Edmond Rostand's 1897 verse play Cyrano de Bergerac, adapted by Steve Martin.  Rostand is mentioned in the opening credits.

Plot 
Charlie "C.D." Bales, the fire chief of a small town, is intelligent, witty, charismatic and athletic. Regardless, he is sensitive about his abnormally large nose, which most know not to talk about; it cannot be surgically altered as he is allergic to anesthesia.  

He is close to many residents, especially his god-sister, Dixie, who owns several rental homes and a diner. When the beautiful Roxanne Kowalski, an astronomy PhD student, comes to search for a comet over the summer, he, and many others in town, are drawn to her. She adores him as a friend, but is physically attracted to Chris McConnell, a handsome but dim-witted fireman.

Roxanne asks C.D. for help with Chris. Seeing him buy a book by Sartre for a friend, she assumes he is deeply intelligent. When Chris hears of her interest, he feels ill as women intimidate him. He tries to write her a letter, but takes all day with little result. He then convinces C.D. to write it with prose that soon woos Roxanne.  

When told Roxanne wants to meet up, Chris again feels sick and insists C.D. help him seem equally brilliant in person. He arrives at Roxanne's wearing a hunter's cap, to hide the earphones that relay C.D.'s words. When the equipment fails, Chris bungles it by expressing himself poorly and she storms back inside, furious. He begs C.D. to fix things, but as Chris can't repeat what C.D. prompts, they switch jackets and hats so C.D. can speak as him. They are successful, and she invites Chris in to make love. 

Roxanne goes out of town for a week, and leaves her hotel address with C.D. so Chris can write. Instead of telling Chris, C D. writes her three times a day, each letter more incredible than the last. As he is writing a new letter to her in Dixie's, he is told Chris is on his way to see Roxanne as she returned early, so he leaves the letter behind to find Chris. C.D., at Roxanne's and after a game of ding dong ditch, warns Chris she may mention letters he supposedly wrote. She tries to get Chris to be the man in the letters, revealing his looks are only secondary for her. Feeling ill, knowing his looks are all he has, he runs out, leaving her confused. Dixie puts the last letter under Roxanne's door with a note revealing C.D. as the author. After reading it, Roxanne calls him over.

Chris prepares to leave town with bartender Sandy, who he met while Roxanne was away. When she asks if he has told Roxanne (the women know each other), he replies that he will write her a letter.

C.D. arrives, unaware that Roxanne knows the truth. She asks him to read one of the letters and then look at the back, which shows that Dixie revealed he's the author. She explodes in anger that he lied to her, punching him in the nose. He retorts that he simply wanted to tell her how he felt, but she was only interested in Chris's looks. When he reminds her that it only took a few nice words for Chris to get her into bed, she throws him out. Before he can say more, he stops and sniffs the air. Slowly walking back to the firehouse, he alerts his team, who then "follows his nose" until they find and extinguish a fire in a barn that if not contained, could burn down the entire town. During their celebration afterwards someone mentions his nose and although everyone expects C.D. will get upset, for once he doesn't.

On his roof, C.D. hears someone speaking his words to him. It's Roxanne, declaring she realizes it is his personality that she loves, not Chris' looks. After she declares her love, C.D. stylishly descends from the roof and they reconcile. In the credits, she reveals she named the comet "Charlie" (C.D.'s first name), after her father.

Cast 

Steve Martin as Charlie "C.D." Bales
Daryl Hannah as Roxanne Kowalski
Rick Rossovich as Chris McConnell
Shelley Duvall as Dixie
John Kapelos as Chuck
Fred Willard as Mayor Deebs
Max Alexander as Dean
Michael J. Pollard as Andy
Steve Mittleman as Ralston
Damon Wayans as Jerry
Matt Lattanzi as Trent
Shandra Beri as Sandy
Jean Sincere as Nina
Thom Curley as Jim (the darts player C.D. takes to task)
Ritch Shydner and Kevin Nealon as Drunk #1 and #2 (C.D. fights them in the opening scene)
Brian George as cosmetic surgeon
Maureen Murphy as cosmetics clerk
Heidi Sorenson as Trudy (Mayor's love interest)

Production 
Steve Martin had always been a fan of the José Ferrer version of Cyrano de Bergerac:
I remember just thinking it was the greatest thing I ever saw. I think it's because the character is so strong. He's like a very smart version of what, coincidentally, is popular in movies today. He's smarter than everybody else, quicker than everybody else, wittier than everybody else and tops everybody. That's what the original Cyrano is like. And this just sort of takes that vicious edge off it.
In the early 1980s Martin had the idea of updating the play, only with the difference that Cyrano would get the girl in the end. He decided to write the screenplay himself, writing 25 drafts over three years.

The film was greenlit at Columbia by then-production chief Guy McElwaine. He was replaced by David Puttnam who liked the script, continued the studio's support and suggested the casting of Daryl Hannah. It was the first film released under Puttnam's auspices at Columbia.

Roxanne was filmed in the summer of 1986 in the town of Nelson, British Columbia. Steve Martin chose to use the local fire hall on Ward Street as a primary set. Although the movie has references to the  town's name being "Nelson", it is portrayed as being in the USA. The mailboxes which figure in the plot are USPS blue, not Canada Post red. In the bar scenes, neon signs for Miller beer show the advertising slogan of the time: "Made the American Way", which was not used in Canada. There is also a scene which shows the fire truck to have a Washington license plate, which complements an earlier scene in which Martin's character makes a reference to Seattle.

Steve Martin's nose makeup took 90 minutes to apply every day and two minutes to take off. "God how I hated that thing", he said.

Reception

Critical response 
Roxanne received an 88% approval rating on Rotten Tomatoes based on 40 reviews, with the consensus being: "Though its sweetness borders on sappiness, Roxanne is an unabashedly romantic comedy that remains one of Steve Martin's funniest". Metacritic gave film a score of 73 based on 19 reviews, indicating "generally favorable reviews".

Roger Ebert hailed the film as a "gentle, whimsical comedy", giving it a 3 and half stars of four, also stating: "What makes "Roxanne" so wonderful is not this fairly straightforward comedy, however, but the way the movie creates a certain ineffable spirit".

It is number #71 on Bravo's "100 Funniest Movies".

Accolades 
It has also won and has been nominated for a number of awards, including:

 Golden Globe Award: Nominated: Best Performance by an Actor in a Motion Picture – Comedy/Musical: Steve Martin
 LAFCA Award: Won (Tied): Best Actor: Steve Martin (Tied with Jack Nicholson for Ironweed (1987) and The Witches of Eastwick (1987).)
 NSFC Award: Won: Best Actor: Steve Martin
 WGA Award (Screen): Won: Best Screenplay Based on Material from Another Medium: Steve Martin

References to the play 
 The historical Cyrano de Bergerac wrote of a journey to the Moon and to the Sun, and Roxanne alludes to this in a scene where Bales jokes about UFOs and aliens. Additionally, that scene mirrors one in the play where Cyrano pretends to fall out of a tree to distract another wooer of Roxanne.
 The names of all three main characters are based on their counterparts in the play. C.D. Bales has the same initials as Cyrano de Bergerac, Roxanne's name is a slight alteration of Roxane, and Chris is a shortened form of Christian.
 The "20 Nose Insults" speech in the film mirrors a similar speech in the play. It even adapts a line from the play:

Cyrano: "Oh, how you must love the little birds so much that when they come and sing to you, you give them this to perch on."
C.D.: "You must love the little birdies to give them this to perch on."

 C.D.'s position in the firefighters is similar to Cyrano's leadership of the Gascon Cadets.

See also 

List of firefighting films

References

External links 

 
 

1987 films
1987 romantic comedy films
American romantic comedy films
Columbia Pictures films
Films directed by Fred Schepisi
Films scored by Bruce Smeaton
Films with screenplays by Steve Martin
Films about firefighting
Films based on Cyrano de Bergerac (play)
Films shot in British Columbia
1980s English-language films
1980s American films